Robert D. Curtis (June 18, 1935 – August 18, 2013) was an American football coach. He served as the head football coach at Franklin & Marshall College from 1971 to 1974 and Bucknell University from 1975 to 1985, compiling a career college football coaching record of 80–59–3.

Coaching career

Waldwick High School
Curtis was the first head football coach at Waldwick High School in Waldwick, New Jersey. He led the Waldwick Warriors to a record of 12–20–3 in five seasons, from the school's opening in 1963 through the 1967 season.

Franklin & Marshall
Curtis was the head football coach at Franklin & Marshall College in Lancaster, Pennsylvania for four seasons, from 1971 until 1974. His coaching record at Franklin & Marshall was 32–3.

Bucknell
Curtis was the head football coach at Bucknell University in Lewisburg, Pennsylvania. He held the position from 1975 through the 1985 season and compiled a record of 48–56–3.

Death
Curtis died on August 18, 2013, at Nottingham Village in Northumberland, Pennsylvania.

Head coaching record

College

References

1935 births
2013 deaths
Bucknell Bison football coaches
Franklin & Marshall Diplomats football coaches
High school football coaches in New Jersey
People from Ridgewood, New Jersey
People from Utica, New York
Coaches of American football from New Jersey